Donald Disney from the Avogy, Inc., Cupertino, CA was named Fellow of the Institute of Electrical and Electronics Engineers (IEEE) in 2014 for contributions to power integrated circuits and energy efficiency applications.

References

Fellow Members of the IEEE
Living people
21st-century American engineers
Year of birth missing (living people)
Place of birth missing (living people)
American electrical engineers